The 2011 Metro Atlantic Athletic Conference men's basketball tournament took place from March 4–7, 2011 at the Webster Bank Arena in Bridgeport, Connecticut.  The tournament was won by Saint Peter's to be crowned with the Metro Atlantic Athletic Conference championship and the conference's automatic bid into the 2011 NCAA tournament.

Bracket

* denotes overtime game

References

2010–11 Metro Atlantic Athletic Conference men's basketball season
MAAC men's basketball tournament
Sports competitions in Bridgeport, Connecticut
MAAC Men's Basketball
College basketball tournaments in Connecticut